The Ullmann reaction or Ullmann coupling is a coupling reaction between aryl halides.  Traditionally this reaction is effected by copper, but palladium and nickel are also effective catalysts. The reaction is named after Fritz Ullmann.

Mechanism
The mechanism of the Ullmann reaction is extensively studied. Complications arise because the reactions are often heterogeneous.  With copper as the halide acceptor, organocopper intermediates are invoked.

Scope
A typical example of classic Ullmann biaryl coupling is the conversion of ortho-chloronitrobenzene into 2,2'-dinitrobiphenyl with a copper - bronze alloy.
 

The traditional version of the Ullmann reaction requires harsh reaction conditions, and the reaction has a reputation for erratic yields. Because of these problems many improvements and alternative procedures have been introduced.

The classical Ullmann reaction is limited to electron deficient aryl halides and requires harsh reaction conditions. Modern variants of the Ullman reaction employing palladium and nickel have widened the substrate scope of the reaction and rendered reaction conditions more mild. Yields are generally still moderate, however. In organic synthesis this reaction is often replaced by palladium coupling reactions such as the Heck reaction, the Hiyama coupling, and the Sonogashira coupling.

Biphenylenes had been obtained before with reasonable yields using 2,2-diiodobiphenyl or 2,2-diiodobiphenylonium ion as starting material.

Closure of 5-membered rings is more facile, but larger rings have also been made using this approach.

Unsymmetric and asymmetric couplings
Ullmann synthesis of biaryl compounds can be used to generate chiral products from chiral reactants. Nelson and collaborators worked on the synthesis of asymmetric biaryl compounds and obtained the thermodynamically controlled product.

The diastereomeric ratio of the products is enhanced with bulkier R groups in the auxiliary oxazoline group.

Unsymmetrical Ullmann reactions are rarely pursued but have been achieved when one of the two coupling components is in excess.

Imidazole Ullmann reaction
The reaction mechanism of the Ullmann reaction is extensively studied. Electron spin resonance rules out a radical intermediate. The oxidative addition / reductive elimination sequence observed with palladium catalysts is unlikely for copper because copper(III) is rarely observed. The reaction probably involves the formation of an organocopper compound (RCuX) which reacts with the other aryl reactant in a nucleophilic aromatic substitution. Alternative mechanisms do exist such as σ-bond metathesis. 

The Ullmann reaction is limited to electron-deficient aryl halides and requires harsh reaction conditions. In organic synthesis this reaction is often replaced by palladium coupling reactions such as the Heck reaction, the Hiyama coupling, and the Sonogashira coupling

In a variation of the Ullmann reaction, β-bromostyrene is reacted with imidazole in an ionic liquid such as 1-butyl-3-methylimidazolium tetrafluoroborate to give an N-styrylimidazole. The reaction requires Lproline in addition to copper iodide as catalyst.

See also
 Ullmann condensation - copper-promoted conversion of aryl halides to ethers, also developed by Fritz Ullmann 
 Copper(I) thiophene-2-carboxylate, a copper reagent used in the Ullmann reaction
 Wurtz–Fittig reaction, a similar reaction useful for alkylbenzenes synthesis

References

Carbon-carbon bond forming reactions
Name reactions